China Bound is a 1929 silent film comedy produced and distributed by Metro-Goldwyn-Mayer. A rarely revived comedy due to some of its Asian racial content, a selected scene was shown in Robert Youngson's 1965 MGM's Big Parade of Comedy.

Prints held at George Eastman House and Filmoteca Espanola (Madrid).

Cast
Karl Dane - Sharkey Nye
George K. Arthur - Eustis
Josephine Dunn - Joan
Polly Moran - Sarah
Carl Stockdale - McAllister
Harry Woods - Officer

References

External links

 China Bound lobby poster...2nd lobby poster

1929 films
American silent feature films
Films directed by Charles Reisner
Metro-Goldwyn-Mayer films
1929 comedy films
Silent American comedy films
American black-and-white films
1920s American films